is a Japanese fantasy light novel series written by Hayaken and illustrated by Nagu. It began serialization online in March 2019 on the user-generated novel publishing website Shōsetsuka ni Narō. It was later acquired by Hobby Japan, who have published eight volumes since November 2019 under their HJ Bunko imprint. A manga adaptation with art by Moto Kuromura has been serialized online via Hobby Japan's Comic Fire website since December 2019 and has been collected in four tankōbon volumes. Both the light novel and manga have been licensed in North America by J-Novel Club. A two-episode mini anime adaptation was released between November 7 and November 14, 2020, on Comic Fire's Twitter account. An anime television series adaptation by Studio Comet premiered in January 2023.

Plot
In the Kingdom of Silvare lived the Hero-King Inglis. With the personal blessing of the goddess Alistia, Inglis became a divine knight, slaying the enemies of humanity and the dark gods to establish the Kingdom. As a last favor granted to him on his deathbed, the goddess Alistia reincarnated Inglis as his single greatest regret was not being able to reach the peak of mastering the blade. Now reborn as a woman (perhaps at the jesting whims of the goddess), Inglis Eucus strives to live a life in the far future where she can truly master the blade.

Characters

The main protagonist of the series and the Hero-King of the Kingdom of Silvare, who reincarnated as a woman in order to dedicate her new life to training martial arts. She is also known by her nickname Chris. Despite accepting her new life as a woman and having girlish habits like a love of desserts and fancy clothes, she still retains parts of her previous life like liking only women and seeing her friends as grandchildren.

Chris' maternal cousin. She possessed an Artifact that allows her to use a magic bow that shoot arrows of light. She is also known by her nickname Rani.

A student at the Knight Academy that Chris and Rani befriend. As a result of her older brother Leon turning traitor and joining the Steelblood Front, her family is shunned for being traitors and untrustworthy by the people. Leone joins the Knight Academy to not only redeem her family's honor but also arrest her brother. She possessed an Artifact sword that change its size.

 A student at the Knight Academy and daughter of the current Prime Minister. Her Artifact allows her to fly.

A Hieral Menace, special humans that can turn into Artifacts. She was previous Leon Olfa's partner before the latter turn traitor.

A Hieral Menace and member of the Steelblood Front.

 A Hieral Menace, Eris colleague and Rafael's partner.

 Rani's older brother and Chris cousin. He possessed an Artifact sword.

 A former Holy Knight and Leone's older brother. Once a respected knight, Leon became a traitor and join the Steelblood Front after having enough of the Highlanders mistreating the surface people.

The mysterious leader of the Steelblood Front, a revolutionary terrorist group that aims to overthrow the Highlanders rule over the surface people.

 The narrator of the series and Chris' previous life. He was known as the Hero-King who fought evil and founded the Kingdom of Silvare. He was a well respected leader who brought peace and prosperity to his people. He died of old age without siring an heir since Inglis was in love with his patron Goddess Alistia, and wanted to marry her instead.

Media

Light novels

Manga

Anime
A two-episode mini anime adaptation of the series was announced on October 31, 2020. The first episode was streamed on November 7, 2020, on Comic Fire's official Twitter account, followed by the second episode on November 14.

On November 29, 2021, a new anime adaptation was announced. It was later revealed to be a television series produced by Studio Comet. The series is directed by Naoyuki Kuzuya, with scripts written by Mitsutaka Hirota, character designs handled by Reiichirō Ōfuji, and music composed by Kenta Higashiohji. It premiered on January 10, 2023, on TV Tokyo and other networks. Crunchyroll licensed the series outside of Asia. Muse Communication licensed the series in South and Southeast Asia.

Notes

References

External links
  at Shōsetsuka ni Narō 
  
  
  
 

2019 Japanese novels
2020 anime ONAs
2023 anime television series debuts
Anime and manga based on light novels
Crunchyroll anime
Fiction about reincarnation
HJ Bunko
Hobby Japan manga
J-Novel Club books
Japanese webcomics
Light novels
Light novels first published online
Shōnen manga
Shōsetsuka ni Narō
Transgender in anime and manga
TV Tokyo original programming
Webcomics in print